William Craig may refer to:

Bill Craig (writer) (1930–2002), Scottish television scriptwriter
Billy Craig (1929–2011), Scottish footballer
Will Craig (born 1994), American baseball player
William Craig (author) (1929–1997), American author
William Craig (botanist) (1832–1922), Scottish botanist and surgeon
William Craig (broadcaster), Canadian broadcaster
William Craig (frontiersman) (1807–1869), American frontiersman and trapper
William Craig (philosopher) (1918–2016), professor of philosophy at the University of California, Berkeley
William Craig (Canadian politician) (1828–1897), Ontario political figure
William Craig (Northern Ireland politician) (1924–2011), Northern Ireland politician
William Craig (priest) (1873–1957), Dean of Ontario
William Craig (Secret Service) (1855–1902), United States Secret Service member
William Craig (swimmer) (1945–2017), American swimmer
William Craig, Lord Craig (1745–1813), Scottish judge
William Benjamin Craig (1877–1925), U.S. Representative from Alabama
William Benson Craig (1896–1918), Canadian flying ace during World War I
William Grindley Craig (1818–1886), British locomotive engineer
William James Craig (1843–1906), first editor of the Oxford Shakespeare
William Lane Craig (born 1949), American philosopher and theologian
William Marshall Craig (died 1827), British painter
William Young Craig (1827–1924), British Member of Parliament for North Staffordshire, 1880–1885
William Gibson-Craig (1797–1878), Scottish politician
Willie Craig, Scottish footballer who played for Celtic FC in the 1956 Scottish Cup Final